The Dagger may refer to:
 The Dagger (1999 film), a Yugoslav film
 The Dagger (1972 film), an Iranian film